Joel Gabuza was the Zimbabwe Minister of Water Resources and Development from 2009 during the Government of National Unity formed between the ruling ZanuPF and the opposition, and held office until 2013 when a new cabinet was appointed, and Oppah Muchinguri-Kashiri was appointed as the new Minister of Water and Climate. He is the Member of House of Assembly for Binga (MDC-T).

On 27 November 2017, Emmerson Mnangagwa, who succeeded ousted President Robert Mugabe following the 2017 Zimbabwe coup d'etat, announced the dissolution of the Zimbabwe Cabinet, leaving only Patrick Chinamasa and Simbarashe Mumbengegwi as acting ministers of Finance and Foreign Affairs respectively. A new cabinet of re-structured ministries was appointed on 30 November 2017, and Oppah Muchinguri-Kashiri was re-appointed as the new Minister of Environment, Water and Climate. Joel Gabuza remains the MDC-T Member of Parliament for Binga.

References

Movement for Democratic Change – Tsvangirai politicians
Members of the National Assembly of Zimbabwe
Living people
Government ministers of Zimbabwe
Year of birth missing (living people)